Alan B. Miller (born August 17, 1937) is an American businessman who is the founder of Universal Health Services, and currently serves as the company's executive chairman. Miller founded the company in 1979 and it has grown to become a large provider of hospital and healthcare services in the US and the UK. In 2022, UHS had revenues of $13.4 billion. In September 2020, UHS announced that, consistent with the company's long-standing succession plan, Alan B. Miller would step down as CEO.

Early years
Miller was born in Brooklyn, New York City, New York on August 17, 1937. His father owned a dry cleaner store and his mother worked for a millinery company. As a youth, Miller enjoyed playing sports and worked for a delivery clerk for a grocery store. He also worked for Western Union.

Miller played basketball in high school. At 6 feet and five inches, he has a height advantage, and his team won a New York City championship in 1954. He received a full scholarship to the University of Utah. He initially started studying in the University of Utah. Ultimately,  he graduated from the College of William and Mary. He earned his MBA from The Wharton School. While  in college, Miller joined the U.S. Army Reserve Officers' Training Corps (ROTC), and was commissioned as a captain in the U.S. Army and served in the 77th Infantry Division after he completed his education.

Career
Miller began his career in the advertising industry at Young & Rubicam in New York, one of the industry's largest advertising agencies. As the agency's youngest vice president, Miller learned about entrepreneurship and risk-taking as he worked with his clients. For example, while he was at Y&R, Miller was instrumental in developing one of the first nationally syndicated television programs, a show called "Cooking With Graham Kerr."

When his former Wharton roommate came to him in 1969 with an idea for a business, Miller decided to leave the advertising industry for a new venture. His new company, called American Medicorp, would build privately owned hospitals in high growth areas—such as California, Nevada, Texas and Florida—that had few hospitals.

Four years later, in 1973, the company was in financial trouble and Miller's partner had left the company. Miller took over as CEO of American Medicorp and engineered a turnaround that brought attention within the healthcare industry. American Medicorp became the target of a hostile takeover by Humana in 1978.

Faced with losing the company, Miller fought Humana's takeover bid. While he was ultimately not able to thwart the takeover, he did force Humana to raise the price it paid for American Medicorp, and generated additional money for all company shareholders.

The day after he lost American Medicorp to a hostile takeover, Alan B. Miller started a new company in the same industry. The new company was called Universal Health Services, Inc. (UHS).

Following the same formula for success that had helped him rebuild American Medicorp, Miller has transformed Universal Health Services, Inc. from a start-up company that had six employees and zero revenue in 1979 into a Fortune 500 company that is one of the nation's largest healthcare corporations. The company currently owns more than 400 acute care hospitals, behavioral health facilities and ambulatory units, has more than 94,000 employees and generates annual revenues of more than $13.4 billion.

In addition to his work with UHS, Miller has served on the boards of directors of The Penn Mutual Life Insurance Company and Broadlane.

In September 2020, consistent with the company's long-standing succession plan, UHS announced that Alan B. Miller would step down as CEO.

Awards
In April 1999, Miller received the first Lifetime Achievement Award from the Federation of American Hospitals in recognition of his work. Miller also received the FAHS Award for leadership in 1978. He was named Master Entrepreneur of the Year in 1991, an award sponsored by Ernst & Young and Merrill Lynch.   In 1992, he was awarded an Honorary Doctorate from the University of South Carolina, and was awarded the Ellis Island Medal of Honor in recognition of his "exceptional humanitarian efforts and outstanding contributions to the country" through healthcare. He is a past recipient of the Americanism Award from the Anti-Defamation League. In 1999, he received the William & Mary Medallion, the highest award presented to alumni. In October 2007, the college awarded him the T.C. and Elizabeth Clarke Business medallion, the school's highest honor for business achievement.
Miller received the George Washington University President's Medal in 2002.  He also received the Chairman's Award from the United Negro College Fund.
In 2010, Miller received the Horatio Alger Award from the Horatio Alger Association.  
In 2019, Miller was presented with the Distinguished Citizen Award from the Freedoms Foundation of Valley Forge, Pa. for his commitment to healthcare, serving others, and his civic leadership. In 2019, Alan B. Miller received the Distinguished Civilian Award from the Ben Franklin Global Forum in recognition of his leadership and accomplishments in providing behavioral healthcare to active duty military, veterans and their families.

Miller has been the list of Modern Healthcare magazine's "100 Most Powerful People in Healthcare" for 17 consecutive years since 2003.

CEO 
Financial World magazine listed Miller among the Outstanding 1000 CEOs in 1995 and 1996. In October 2014, Miller was awarded the Innovator Award, Healthcare CEO of the Year by Philadelphia Business Journal. In May 2015, Miller was named to Wall Street Journal's "America's Longest-Serving CEO's."  In 2015, Miller was also named among CR Magazine's 2015 Responsible CEOs of the Year. In 2019, Alan B. Miller was named to the Forbes "America's Most Innovative Leaders" ranking (#95). The ranking is created by the Forbes editorial team.
In 2019, Alan B. Miller was named to the Philadelphia Business Journal 2019 Most Admired CEOs list. In 2019, Alan B. Miller was named to the Fox Business list of 10 military veterans who became CEOs of Fortune 500 companies. In 2020, Alan B. Miller was highlighted in Wall Street Journal article: New Thinking Emerges on Optimal Tenure for a CEO. In 2020, Alan B. Miller was named to the longest living CEOs globally in the S&P 500 by International Business Times.

References

External links
 Universal Health Services, Inc. website

Living people
Businesspeople from New York City
1937 births
People from Brooklyn
University of Utah alumni
College of William & Mary alumni
Wharton School of the University of Pennsylvania alumni
American chief executives of Fortune 500 companies
American health care chief executives